Kushla is an unincorporated community in Mobile County, Alabama, United States. A post office operated under the name Kushla from 1887 to 1919. The community's name is likely derived from the Choctaw words kusha meaning "cane" and hieli meaning "standing".

Geography

References

Unincorporated communities in Alabama
Unincorporated communities in Mobile County, Alabama
Alabama placenames of Native American origin